The following albums, singles and EPs released by English singer-songwriter Gerard McMahon under the pseudonyms Gerard, Gerard McMahon, Gerard McMann and G TOM MAC.

Other
Witchblade The Music (Edge Artists 2004) Compilation by Various Artists, compiled and produced by G TOM MAC.

Notes

 

Discographies of British artists
Pop music discographies